The discography of American country music singer-songwriter John Anderson consists of 22 studio albums and 68 singles. He recorded for Warner Bros. Records from 1980 to 1986, and again in 2007. Other labels to which he was signed include MCA, Capitol, BNA, Mercury, and Easy Eye Sound. His most commercially successful album, 1992's Seminole Wind, achieved double platinum certification from the Recording Industry Association of America (RIAA). Anderson has charted five number 1 singles on the Hot Country Songs charts, and has had 15 other singles reach Top 10.

Studio albums

1980s

1990s

2000s–2020s

Compilation albums

Singles

1970s

1980s

1990s

2000s–2020s

Other singles

Charted B-sides

Other charted songs

Featured singles

Music videos

References

Anderson, John
Discographies of American artists